Jana Vápeníková (born 10 July 1964 in Jablonec) is a former Czech biathlete. She won the gold medal on the relay at the Biathlon World Championships 1993 in Borovetz together with Eva Háková, Iveta Roubíčková and Jiřina Pelčová. At the Winter Olympics her best individual placing was 43rd at the 1992 Winter Olympics in Albertville.

References 

1964 births
Living people
Czech female biathletes
Czechoslovak female biathletes
Olympic biathletes of Czechoslovakia
Olympic biathletes of the Czech Republic
Biathletes at the 1992 Winter Olympics
Biathletes at the 1994 Winter Olympics
Sportspeople from Jablonec nad Nisou
Biathlon World Championships medalists